The Carnegie Library of Washington D.C., also known as Central Public Library, now known as the Apple Carnegie Library, is situated in Mount Vernon Square, Washington, D.C. Donated to the public by entrepreneur Andrew Carnegie, it was dedicated on January 7, 1903. It was designed by the New York firm of Ackerman & Ross in the style of Beaux-Arts architecture.

It was the first Carnegie library in Washington, D.C. and D.C.'s first desegregated public building.

It was listed on the National Register of Historic Places, as "Central Public Library", in 1969.

It was used as the central public library for Washington, D.C. for almost 70 years before it became overcrowded. The central library was then moved to Martin Luther King Jr. Memorial Library. After being shut down for ten years, it was renovated as part of University of the District of Columbia.

In 1999, it became the headquarters for the Historical Society of Washington, D.C. The City Museum of Washington opened in the library in May 2003, but closed less than two years later.

In 2014, Events DC twice sought to move the International Spy Museum into the library, but failed to win historic preservation approval.

In September 2016, Apple Inc. proposed renovating the library into D.C.'s second Apple Store location. In December 2016, Events DC announced an agreement with the company for conversion of the space into a new store designed by Foster and Partners. The building was renamed the Apple Carnegie Library, and the Apple Store within opened on May 11, 2019. Apple hosts free daily sessions focused on photography, filmmaking, music creation, coding, design and more. On October 9, 2019 the first episode of Oprah's Book Club, a television series produced by Apple, was filmed with a live audience in the Library. The episode premiered on November 1 of the same year.

The building also now houses the DC History Center on the second floor, and the Carnegie Gallery (featuring historic photographs and documents about the origins and history of the building) in the basement.

See also
 Architecture of Washington, D.C.

References 

Carnegie libraries in Washington, D.C.
Libraries on the National Register of Historic Places in Washington, D.C.
Beaux-Arts architecture in Washington, D.C.
Mount Vernon Square